Esperança Bias (born 1958) is a Mozambican politician. She is a gradulate of the Faculty of Economy at the Eduardo Mondlane University. From 1999 to 2005, she served as the Deputy Minister of Mineral Resources (beginning in 1999). From 2005 to 2015, she served as Mozambique's Minister of Mineral Resources. In 2015, incoming president Filipe Nyusi replaced her with Pedro Conceição Couto.

In February 2016, she was elected to the Secretariat of Mozambique's FRELIMO party as Secretary for Administration and Finance.

References

1958 births
Living people
Presidents of the Assembly of the Republic (Mozambique)
Government ministers of Mozambique
FRELIMO politicians
Women government ministers of Mozambique
20th-century Mozambican women politicians
20th-century Mozambican politicians
21st-century Mozambican women politicians
21st-century Mozambican politicians